Henry Street is a  street in Fremantle, Western Australia. It was developed very early in the history of the Swan River Colony with licensed premises being located as early as 1833.

Henry Street has seen significant funeral processions pass along it on their way to the Fremantle Cemetery.

It has some significant historical buildings, including Falk & Company Warehouse, Fowler's Warehouse, Fremantle Customs House, the Marich Buildings, the Moore's Building, the Bateman Hardware building and the Orient Hotel. 33 Henry Street was a regular meeting place for a range of Fremantle associations.

See also

References

 
Streets in Fremantle
Articles containing video clips